Events from the year 1884 in Scotland.

Incumbents

Law officers 
 Lord Advocate – John Blair Balfour
 Solicitor General for Scotland – Alexander Asher

Judiciary 
 Lord President of the Court of Session and Lord Justice General – Lord Glencorse
 Lord Justice Clerk – Lord Moncreiff

Events 
 26 January – Scotland beat Ireland 5-0 in the first match of the first British Home Championship in Association football.
 15 March – Scotland beat England 1-0 in their second match of the British Home Championship.
 29 March – Scotland beat Wales 4-1 to win the first British Home Championship.
 28 April – Napier Commission delivers the Report of Her Majesty's Commissioners of Inquiry Into the Condition of the Crofters and Cottars in the Highlands and Islands of Scotland.
 12 June – Pier terminal opened at Rothesay, Bute.
 1 July – First International Forestry Exhibition opens at Donaldson's Hospital, Edinburgh, during which an electric railway is demonstrated.
 17 July – Barque Vicksburg of Leith goes aground on Muckle Skerry in the Pentland Skerries with the loss of nine lives; twelve are saved by the island's lighthouse keepers.
 Autumn – Origin of St Johnstone F.C. in Perth.
 2 November – Fourteen people are killed when some of the audience at the Star Theatre, Glasgow, panic following a false fire alarm.
 11 November – Blackford Hill is acquired by the city of Edinburgh.
 18 November – Crofters War: Royal Marines and police arrive in naval ships at Uig, Skye, following an unsuccessful attempt to evict tenants engaging in a rent strike against Major William Fraser, owner of the Kilmuir Estate and Uig Tower.
 1 December – Edinburgh Suburban and Southside Junction Railway opens to passengers.
 Teacher's Highland Cream blended whisky registered.

Births 
 11 February – Joseph Westwood, Labour MP (1922–31 and 1935–48) and Secretary of State for Scotland (1945–1947) (died 1948)
 24 February – William Theodore Heard, Cardinal of the Roman Catholic church (died 1973 in Rome)
 22 May – Wilhelmina Hay Abbott, suffragist and feminist (died 1957 in England)
 28 August – Peter Fraser, Labour prime minister of New Zealand (1940–1949) (died 1950 in New Zealand)

Deaths 
 26 February – Alexander Wood, physician, inventor of the first true hypodermic syringe (born 1817)
 30 November – Sir Alexander Grant, 10th Baronet, Principal of the University of Edinburgh (born 1826 in the United States)
 20 December – William Lindsay Alexander, church leader (born 1808)
 Anthony Inglis, shipbuilder (born 1813)

The arts
 Publication of Songs of the North by Harold Boulton and Anne MacLeod including the first known version of "The Skye Boat Song".

See also 
 Timeline of Scottish history
 1884 in the United Kingdom

References 

 
Years of the 19th century in Scotland
Scotland
1880s in Scotland